Vittorio the Vampire (1999) is a horror novel by American writer Anne Rice, the second in her New Tales of the Vampires series. It is the only vampire novel by Rice besides Pandora in which the lead character of her series The Vampire Chronicles, Lestat de Lioncourt, does not appear; although Vittorio references him briefly.

Plot summary
In the twentieth century, from his castle in the northern part of Tuscany, Vittorio writes the tragic tale of his life.

In 1450, Vittorio di Raniari is a sixteen-year-old Italian nobleman, when his family is murdered by a powerful and ancient coven of vampires. The image of his siblings' severed heads with eyes staring fixedly at him strikes him permanently. Vittorio, however, escapes such a dreadful ending because of a vampire's intervention.

After taking care of his family's burial, Vittorio gathers what riches he can and prepares himself for adventure as he flees towards Florence, away from the perilous crowd of vampires, under the sun's protecting wing.

By nightfall, Vittorio arrives at the most strange of villages, for there are no beggars at the street, no elderly, no sick or dying. Yet his mournful spirit prevents him from taking notice of it. He soon realizes that someone is stalking him, and, worried enough, he seeks shelter at an inn.

Ursula, the vampire who prevented the other members of her coven from killing Vittorio, lurks behind his room's window. She continues to seduce him, all while draining blood from him, and giving him some of her own.

Vittorio is led by Ursula to the coven's lair, as she attempts to make him part of their gatherings. It is an ancient castle, where he discovers its many gardens filled with old people and sick children; he suddenly realizes that some of these people he had met at the village. Vittorio then witnesses an important feast that is carried on as a ritual by the leader of the vampires' group. In it, some people who were selected from the gardens are sacrificed to satisfy their thirst for blood.

After refusing the dark gift, the vampires do not kill him (thanks to Ursula), but rather leave him in a village.  As he is walking, he sees two Angels arguing in a doorway, Ramiel and Setheus. The angels are just as surprised as he that Vittorio can see them (he later learns that they are the guiding angels of his idol, Fra Filippo Lippi). With their help, the help of his own angels, and a very powerful armor-wearing angel, Mastema, Vittorio plots his revenge against the vampires, who are invading the lands and killing innocents (incidentally, Vittorio's own guiding angels do not play much of a part; whilst they are often present, they are insubstantial and shadowy, and we do not know their names).

The attack takes place in the day and involves decapitating the vampires as they sleep. The heads are then thrown into the sunlight where they wither and die. When it comes time to behead Ursula, Vittorio finds that he cannot do this even as the angels urge him on. Instead, he frees Ursula in the hopes of saving her soul. Within minutes, Vittorio is tricked into becoming a vampire and a yearning for blood conquers everything he knows.

In the closing pages we find Ursula and Vittorio performing as an age old Bonnie and Clyde, killing and drinking until they had their fill. These two lovers stay with each other for many years to come.

Vittorio is unique in two ways: he can see angels and departing human souls. At the end of the book, he is left with the "gift" to see human souls, which appear from every person as an intense shining light. Mastema tells him that he will never be able to rid himself of this, and that every time he takes a human life he will bear witness to the extinguishing of the soul.

The Vampire Chronicles novels
Novels by Anne Rice
Alfred A. Knopf books
1999 American novels